This is a list of the best-selling albums in the United Kingdom each year. The sales figures given are only within that year, but each album has sold more copies overall.

Best-selling albums by year

Best-selling albums by decade

See also
 List of best-selling singles by year in the United Kingdom
 List of best-selling compilation albums by year in the United Kingdom

References

United Kingdom, by year
Best-selling albums by year